Boukoukpanbe is a village in the Bassar Prefecture of the Kara Region of northwestern Togo.

References

Populated places in Kara Region
Bassar Prefecture